TCDD DH9500 is a diesel-hydraulic locomotive operated by the Turkish State Railways (TCDD). A total of 26 units were delivered from 1999 by Tülomsaş. They are a hydraulic derivative of DE11000 delivered in the 1980s.

References

 

Tülomsaş locomotives
B-B locomotives
DH 9500
Standard gauge locomotives of Turkey
Railway locomotives introduced in 1999